The decans (Egyptian bꜣktw or baktiu, "[those] connected with work") are 36 groups of stars (small constellations) used in the ancient Egyptian astronomy to conveniently divide the 360 degree ecliptic into 36 parts of 10 degrees each, both for theurgical and heliacal horological purposes. The decans each appeared, geocentrically, to rise consecutively on the horizon throughout each daily earth rotation. The rising of each decan marked the beginning of a new decanal "hour" (Greek hōra) of the night for the ancient Egyptians, and they were used as a sidereal star clock beginning by at least the 9th or 10th Dynasty (c. 2100 BCE).

Because a new decan also appears heliacally every ten days (that is, every ten days, a new decanic star group reappears in the eastern sky at dawn right before the Sun rises, after a period of being obscured by the Sun's light), the ancient Greeks called them dekanoi (δεκανοί; pl. of δεκανός dekanos) or "tenths".

Decans gave way to a lunar division of 27 or 28 lunar stations, also known as manzil, lunar mansions or nakshatras and thence to a zodiac of 12 signs, based on an anthropomorphic pattern of constellations, and their use can be seen in the Dendera zodiac dated to circa 50 BCE.

Ancient Egyptian origins 

Decans first appeared in the 10th Dynasty (2100 BCE) on coffin lids.  The sequence of these star patterns began with Sothis (Sirius), and each decan contained a set of stars and corresponding divinities.  As measures of time, the rising and setting of decans marked 'hours' and groups of 10 days which comprised an Egyptian year. The ancient Book of Nut covers the subject of the decans.

There were 36 decans (36 × 10 = 360 days), plus five added days to compose the 365 days of a solar based year. Decans measure sidereal time and the solar year is six hours longer; the Sothic and solar years in the Egyptian calendar realign every 1460 years. Decans represented on coffins from later dynasties (such as King Seti I) compared with earlier decan images demonstrate the Sothic-solar shift.

According to Sarah Symons:

Although we know the names of the decans, and in some cases can translate the names (ḥry-ỉb wỉꜣ means 'in the centre of the boat') the locations of the decanal stars and their relationships to modern star names and constellations are not known. This is due to many factors, but key problems are the uncertainty surrounding the observation methods used to develop and populate the diagonal star tables, and the criteria used to select decans (brightness, position, relationship with other stars, and so on).

Later developments
These predictable heliacal re-appearances by the decans were eventually used by the Egyptians to mark the divisions of their annual solar calendar. Thus the heliacal rising of Sirius marked the annual flooding of the Nile.

This method led to a system of 12 daytime hours and 12 nighttime hours, varying in length according to the season.  Later, a system of 24 "equinoctial" hours was used.

After Hellenistic astrology arose in Alexandria, recorded principally in the work of Claudius Ptolemy and Vettius Valens, various systems attributing symbolic significance to decans arose and linked these to the "wandering stars" and the "Lights": the Sun, Moon, Mercury Venus, Mars as well as Jupiter and Saturn.  Decans were connected, for example, with the winds, the four directions, the sect (day or night,) male and female, as well as the four humours (elements;) also these were hermetically considered linked with various diseases and with the timing for the engraving of talismans for curing them; with decanic "faces" (or "phases"), a system where three decans are assigned to each zodiacal sign, each covering 10° of the zodiac, and each ruled by a planetary ruler (see Decan (astrology)); and correlated with astrological signs.

Descriptions of the decans
Decans are named in various Greco-Egyptian sources, many Hermetic writings, the Testament of Solomon, and the writings of Aristobulus of Paneas. Julius Firmicus Maternus, Cosmas of Maiuma, Joseph Justus Scaliger, and Athanasius Kircher.

Images of the decans are described in Hermetic writings, by the Indian astrologer Varāhamihira, in the Picatrix, and in Japanese writings.  Varāhamihira's images of the decans was influenced by Greco-Egyptian, if not Hermetic, depictions of the decans by way of the Yavanajataka.  Their role in Japanese astrology may have derived from an earlier Chinese or Indian form possibly from adding the twelve animals of the Chinese zodiac to a list of twenty-four hour stars.  They were most common between the Kamakura and Edo periods.

The first original decan position due to the precession in ancient times started at 0° of Cancer when the heliacal rising of Sirius (Egyptian Sepdet; Greco-Egyptian: Sothis) on sunset like Jewish and Islamic calendars marking the Egyptian New Year and now the 1st decan falls on 0° of Leo at July 20 in the Julian calendar, that is July 22/23 on the Gregorian calendar.

Ancient India 

In India, the division of the zodiac into 36 ten degree portions is called either the drekkana (drekkāṇa),the dreshkana (dreṣkāṇa), or the drikana (dṛkāṇa).

The iconography and use of the drekkanas is mention earliest by Sphujidhvaja in Yavanajataka (269–270 CE), and given detailed treatment by Varahamihira in his Brihat-Samhita (550 CE). Modern scholars believe the decans were imported into India through the Greeks, who learned about them from the Egyptians.

See also
Asterism (astronomy)
Astronomical ceiling of Senemut Tomb
Astrotheology
Chinese zodiac
Line of advantage
Palazzo Schifanoia, Ferrara

Footnotes

References

Further reading

External links 
Ancient Egyptian Astronomy Database (Symons, Cockcroft, Bettencourt & Koykka, 2013) 
Egypt Astronomy/Astrology: The decans

Asterisms (astronomy)
Constellations
Ancient astronomy
Technical factors of Chinese astrology
Technical factors of Western astrology
Egyptian calendar